Ireangelus is a genus of kleptoparasitic spider wasps from the sub-family Ceropalinae of the family Pompilidae. The genus has a pan tropical distribution, being known from Oriental, Neotropical, Australian, eastern Palearctic, and Madagascan Zoogeographic regions being best represented in the Neotropics.  Irenangelus is closely related to the more widespread genus Ceropales, the two genera forming a monophyletic subfamily, Ceropalinae within the Pompilidae.  This is regarded as the most basal grouping of the Pompilidae but this view is problematic because of the kleptoparasitic life history of the Ceropalines, it is now considered that they Ceropalines and other pompilids evolved from a common ectoparasitoid ancestor.

Biology
In the Philippines species of Irenangelus are known to be kleptoparasites of Auplopus nyemitawa and Tachypompilus analis, and I. eberlmrdi is a kleptoparasite of Auplopus semialatus. The kleptoparasitic behaviour of I. lukosanus was observed and it pursues its host pompilid Platydialepis ryoheii as the latter transports its prey, Heteropoda forcipata to the nest. The cleptoparasitic wasp pounces on the spider and extends her gaster, trying to insert the tip into a slit of the prey's booklung.

Species
Some species included in Irenangelus include:

Irenangelus clarus (Evans, 1969)
Irenangelaus crossopus (Kimsey & Wasbauer, 2004)
Irenangelus eberhardi (Evans, 1987)
Irenangelus evansi (Kimsey & Wasbauer, 2004)
Irenangelus furtivus (Evans, 1969)
Irenangelus hikosamis (Wahis, 2007)
Irenangelus hispaniolae (Evans, 1969)
Irenangelus ichneumoides (Ducke, 1908)
Irenangelus intrusus Banks
Ireangelus lucidus (Evans, 1969)
Irenangelus lukosanus (Wahis, 2007)
Irenangelus luzonensis (Rohwer, 1919)
Irenangelus madescassus (Wahis, 1988)
Irenangelus mexicanus (Turner 1917)
Irenangelus nambui (Shimizu, 2007)
Irenangelus pernix (Bingham, 1896) 
Irenangelus punctipleuris (Wahis, 2007)
Irenangelus reversus (Smith, 1873)
Irenangelus townesorum (Evans, 1969)
Irenangelus tucumanus (Evans, 1969)

References

Ceropalinae
Hymenoptera genera